Ujah is a Nigerian surname. Notable people with the surname include:

 Anthony Ujah (born 1990), Nigerian footballer
 Chijindu Ujah (born 1994), British-Nigerian athlete
 Innocent Ujah Idibia, also known as 2Baba, Nigerian singer, musician, and activist

Surnames of Nigerian origin